Jayhan Odlum-Smith (born 11 January 2002) is a Saint Lucian swimmer. He competed in the men's 50 metre butterfly event at the 2017 World Aquatics Championships. In 2019, he represented Saint Lucia at the 2019 World Aquatics Championships held in Gwangju, South Korea. He competed in the men's 50 metre butterfly and men's 100 metre butterfly events.

References

2002 births
Living people
Saint Lucian male swimmers
Male butterfly swimmers
Place of birth missing (living people)
Swimmers at the 2018 Summer Youth Olympics
Swimmers at the 2022 Commonwealth Games
Commonwealth Games competitors for Saint Lucia